Phacusa dolosa is a moth of the family Zygaenidae. It was described by Francis Walker in 1856. It is found in India and Myanmar.

References

Moths described in 1856
Procridinae